Balink is a Dutch surname. Notable people with the surname include:

Albert Balink (1906–1976), Dutch journalist and filmmaker
Henry Balink (1882–1963), Dutch-born American painter, draughtsman, and etcher

See also
Balinka (disambiguation)

Dutch-language surnames